Jean Richard Filder (born 7 December 1994) is a Haitian professional footballer who plays as a forward for Madureira.

Career statistics

Club

Notes

References

1994 births
Living people
Haitian footballers
Haitian expatriate footballers
Association football forwards
Sheikh Russel KC players
Esporte Clube Santo André players
Esporte Clube São Bernardo players
Paulista Futebol Clube players
Madureira Esporte Clube players
Haitian expatriate sportspeople in Bangladesh
Expatriate footballers in Bangladesh
Expatriate footballers in Brazil